Tyrell Sloan (born 3 June 2002) is an Australian professional rugby league footballer who plays as a  and er for the St. George Illawarra Dragons in the NRL.

Background
Sloan was born in Campbelltown, New South Wales and is of Indigenous Australian (Wiradjuri) background.

Sloan played his junior rugby league for the Dapto Canaries.

Playing career

2021
Prior to the start of the 2021 NRL season, Sloan signed a three year contract with the St. George Illawarra Dragons as a development player.

In round 15 of the 2021 NRL season, Sloan made his first grade debut for St. George Illawarra against the Canberra Raiders, scoring a try in a comeback 22–20 victory at WIN Stadium.

In round 25, he scored two tries for the club in a 20-16 loss against South Sydney.

2022
After St. George Illawarra's round 3 loss to arch-rivals Cronulla, Sloan was demoted to the NSW Cup by head coach Anthony Griffin.  Fox League pundit Matthew Johns described Sloan's demotion as "Insanity".  After spending two months in reserve grade, Sloan was recalled to the first grade team for their Magic Round match against the Gold Coast.  The club would go on to lose the match with Sloan being cited for making key errors which lead to Gold Coast tries.  The following week, Sloan was again demoted to the NSW Cup.

Statistics

References

External links

St. George Illawarra Dragons profile

2002 births
Living people
Australian rugby league players
Indigenous Australian rugby league players
St. George Illawarra Dragons players
Rugby league fullbacks
Rugby league players from Sydney